Caloptilia rhois is a moth of the family Gracillariidae. It is known from China (Zhejiang, Hubei, Hunan, Jiangxi, Shannxi, Sichuan, Anhui, Fujian, Gansu, Guizhou, Henan), Hong Kong, Japan (Honshū, Kyūshū, Hokkaidō) and Korea.

The wingspan is 11.8-13.2 mm. There are two forms, an aestival and an autumnal form.

The larvae feed on Rhus javanica and Toxicodendron succedaneum. They mine the leaves of their host plant.

References

rhois
Moths of Asia
Moths described in 1982